Little Darlings is a 1980 American teen comedy-drama film starring Tatum O'Neal and Kristy McNichol and featuring Armand Assante and Matt Dillon. It was directed by Ronald F. Maxwell. The screenplay was written by Kimi Peck and Dalene Young and the original music score was composed by Charles Fox. The film was marketed with the tagline "Don't let the title fool you", a reference to a scene in which Randy comments on Angel's name, to which Angel replies, "Don't let the name fool you."

Film critic Roger Ebert said of the film that it "somehow does succeed in treating the awesome and scary subject of sexual initiation with some of the dignity it deserves."

Plot
A group of teenage girls from Atlanta go to summer camp, and, unbeknownst to the adults, two of them make a bet as to which one will lose her virginity first, with all the girls in camp betting money on the contest. The girls involved in the contest are opposites and rivals: cynical, suspicious and streetwise poor girl Angel Bright and naive, prissy and romantic rich girl Ferris Whitney. The rest of the girls divide into two "teams", each rooting for and egging on either Ferris or Angel.  The two girls then choose guys they want to lose their virginity with. Angel targets Randy, a boy from the camp across the lake, and Ferris attempts to seduce Gary Callahan, the (much older) camp counselor.

The girls also engage in typical teenage camp behavior, like food fights and singing around a campfire. Both girls discover that sex is not what they thought it would be. Ferris thinks of sex as love and romance and wine and flowers and poetry. She imagines herself swept off her feet by Gary. When she lies about "making love" with him, Gary gets in trouble for having sex with a fifteen-year-old. She discovers that physical sex can have ugly consequences. Her attitude is now more grounded in reality; she has become more like street-wise Angel.

Meanwhile, street-wise Angel approaches the same issue from the other side and learns the opposite lesson. She views winning the contest as a purely biological act, "no big deal" and "nothing", as her mother told her. But when she tries to do "it" with Randy in a boathouse, she becomes confused by scary feelings she did not know she had. She behaves defensively, like she doesn't want it. Randy, now also confused, is put off by her recalcitrance and leaves.

Angel sees that sex is more than just a mechanical function she can cynically turn on and off. It involves feelings and caring and love. Sex is important, and something she deeply wants. As Randy leaves, she tearfully protests, "But I like you!"

She meets Randy a few days later with a much-improved attitude—one closer to Ferris's. This time she pays attention, not to condoms and clothing, but to Randy and her feelings about him. As the novel adapted from the film's screenplay describes it, "All her fear and resistance melted as they kissed. Soon, she didn't know who was touching whom, only that it was wonderful and right and fine."

Angel has sex (offscreen) with Randy in the boathouse, but she doesn't tell the other girls. Ferris remains a virgin and lies about an evening of romantic passion ("We had chilled Chablis; the darkness enveloped us.").

In the end, Ferris discovers that sex is not just a fantasy of poetry and flowers and moonlight or something from a novel. The biological aspect is not necessarily romantic.  Angel discovers that biological sex involves powerful emotions that touch her deeply and transform her soul. Neither girl is quite ready for the emotional aspects that sex brings: When Randy seeks her out, Angel admits that while she likes him, and she is not ready for that kind of a relationship (he says they can start over, but Angel observes that it's too late and wouldn't be enough), while Ferris apologizes to Gary. Together, the girls talk with the camp director and confess the situation, saving Gary's job.

Angel and Ferris, the two outsiders, discover they are more alike than different, and as they return home to their parents, they become best friends.

Cast
 Tatum O'Neal as Ferris Whitney
 Kristy McNichol as Angel Bright
 Armand Assante as Gary Callahan
 Matt Dillon as Randy Adams
 Maggie Blye as Ms. Bright
 Nicolas Coster as Mr. Whitney
 Marianne Gordon as Mrs. Whitney
 Krista Errickson as Cinder Carlson
 Alexa Kenin as Dana
 Mary Betten as Miss Nichols
 Abby Bluestone as Chubby
 Troas Hayes as Diane
 Cynthia Nixon as Sunshine Walker
 Simone Schachter as Carrots
 Jenn Thompson as Penelope Schubert

Production
The film was made by Stephen Friedman's Kings Road Productions. Paramount agreed to provide $5.3 million to make it in exchange for $14.3 million to market and develop the film.

Kristy McNichol had the first pick of lead roles over Tatum O’Neal and chose the role of Angel, the more streetwise character.
 
Principal photography on Little Darlings began on March 19, 1979 at Hard Labor Creek State Park, 50 miles east of Atlanta. The gas station men's room (condom) scene was filmed in downtown Rutledge, the town nearest the park. The meeting place for the buses at the beginning and ending were filmed in a parking lot near the offices of The Atlanta Journal-Constitution, and the old Omni Coliseum can be seen in the background including in the last scene of the movie. When Ferris is driven into town, they pass the Swan House, indicating that her family lives in Buckhead, a wealthy part of town to the north of the city.

Soundtrack and licensing issues
The film was notable for having a contemporary pop soundtrack, with music by artists like Blondie, Rickie Lee Jones, Supertramp, The Cars, and Iain Matthews. The original video release—on blue box VHS and laserdisc—kept the soundtrack intact; however, many songs in the film such as Supertramp's "School", John Lennon's "Oh My Love" and The Bellamy Brothers' "Let Your Love Flow" were removed from the second round of home releases—VHS red box—due to licensing issues, and were replaced with sound-alikes.

On January 7, 2012, Lionsgate announced the release of the film on DVD, but it was later canceled.

As of 2019, the film has not been released on DVD or Blu-ray, but has been made available for digital video rental on iTunes and Amazon Prime. Turner Classic Movies also aired the original theatrical version, letterboxed, and with all original music and credits intact. Canada’s Hollywood Suite aired the original theatrical version on June 22, 2021, with a replay scheduled for the following day.

Reception
The film made $19.4 million domestically against a budget of $5.3 million. NBC later acquired broadcasting rights for $2.7 million and the network first aired the film on May 9, 1983. The film also made $1.2 million in the ancillary markets.

On Rotten Tomatoes, the film holds a "fresh" approval rating of 67% based on nine reviews. On Metacritic, the film holds a score of 45 out of 100 based on nine reviews, indicating "mixed or average reviews".

Frank Rich of Time praised McNichol’s acting, but criticized the script and said the characters were underdeveloped. Janet Maslin of The New York Times wrote, “Miss O'Neal and Miss McNichol, both lovely and accomplished actresses, are much better than their material. And they go a long way toward lending the story a little charm.”

Roger Ebert of the Chicago Sun-Times also criticized the tonal inconsistencies of the film, but noted that “the scenes in which [the characters] actually confront the realities of sex are handled so thoughtfully and tastefully that they almost seem to belong to another movie.”

TV version
For its broadcast on TV, Little Darlings was shown in a heavily edited version which had all the sex-related scenes and dialogue removed, giving the impression that, instead of trying to lose their virginity, Angel and Ferris were engaged in competition simply to make a guy fall in love with them. The deleted scenes were replaced with alternate footage not seen in the theatrical version, including a scene in which Angel rescues Ferris from drowning in the lake during a thunderstorm. Some additional music was also used in this version. Director Ron Maxwell has stated that he had no participation in this TV version and does not approve of it.

Awards and honors
Young Artist Awards
Nominee: Second Best Young Actress in a Major Motion Picture - Kristy McNichol

References
Notes

External links
 
 
 
 
 
 
 Little Darlings at 80s Movie Guide

1980s coming-of-age comedy-drama films
1980 films
Films set in Atlanta
1980s teen comedy-drama films
American coming-of-age comedy-drama films
American teen comedy-drama films
Films about virginity
Films directed by Ronald F. Maxwell
Films scored by Charles Fox
Paramount Pictures films
Films about summer camps
Teen sex comedy films
1980 directorial debut films
American female buddy films
1980s English-language films
Juvenile sexuality in films
1980s female buddy films
1980s American films